Oonops mahnerti is a spider species found in Greece.

See also 
 List of Oonopidae species

References

External links 

Oonopidae
Spiders of Europe
Spiders described in 1974